Baron Ker may refer to:
 Baron (Lord) Ker of Cessford and Cavertoun (in the Peerage of Scotland) is from 1616 one of the subsidiary titles for Duke of Roxburghe
 Baron (Lord) Ker of Cessford and Overton (in the Peerage of Scotland too) is from 1707 another of the subsidiary titles for Duke of Roxburghe
 Baron Ker of Kersehugh (in the Peerage of the United Kingdom) is from 1821 one of the subsidiary titles for Marquess of Lothian
 Baron Ker of Wakefield (in the Peerage of Great Britain) was from 1741 to 1805 one of the subsidiary titles for Duke of Roxburghe